Epipremnum moluccanum is a species of flowering plant belonging to the genus Epipremnum and the family Araceae.

Distribution and habitat
It is native to the Maluku Islands.

References

moluccanum
Plants described in 1863
Flora of Indo-China
Taxa named by Heinrich Wilhelm Schott